List of aerial victories of Kurt Wolff

Kurt Wolff was a German flying ace of the First World War. He scored 33 aerial victories in the four months from 6 March to 7 July 1917. He scored his first 29 victories while flying in Jagdstaffel 11. Two more victories came while he was temporarily commanding Jagdstaffel 29. Posted back to Jagdstaffel 11 as commander, Wolff scored his final two victories. Wolff's 24th victory was a notable one, as he killed Major H. D. Harvey-Kelly.

This list is complete for entries, though obviously not for all details. Double break in list marks transition between jagdstaffeln. Information was abstracted from Above the Lines: The Aces and Fighter Units of the German Air Service, Naval Air Service and Flanders Marine Corps, 1914–1918, p. 233. Abbreviations from those sources were expanded by editor creating this list.

References
 Franks, Norman; Frank W. Bailey; Russell Guest. Above the Lines: The Aces and Fighter Units of the German Air Service, Naval Air Service and Flanders Marine Corps, 1914–1918. Grub Street, 1993. .

Aerial victories of Wolff, Kurt
Wolff, Kurt